Dr Syed Husin Ali is a retired academic and politician who served as president of the left-wing Parti (Sosialis) Rakyat Malaysia. He is also a prominent political detainee, who was held for six years without trial under Malaysia's Internal Security Act, from 1974 to 1980. Following the merger of Parti Rakyat Malaysia with Parti Keadilan Nasional, he held the position of deputy president of the merged entity Parti Keadilan Rakyat from 2003 to 2010. He also served two terms in Malaysia's Senate (the Dewan Negara) from 2009 to 2015.

Background

Syed Husin Ali was born in Batu Pahat, Johor, on 23 September 1936. Syed Husin Ali's parents were of royal lineage from the Indonesian Sultanate of Siak.

He had three older step-siblings and three younger siblings including the activist/politician Syed Hamid Ali who was formerly head of PKR’s Batu Pahat division.

He completed his primary and secondary school education in Batu Pahat, before going on to obtain a B.A. Hons as well as an M.A. from the University of Malaya (UM) and a Ph.D. (Social Anthropology) from the London School of Economics and Political Science (LSE) in the 1960s.

Author and academic

As an author and academic Syed Husin has written and edited approximately 20 books.

Among them include The Malays: Their Problems and Future, Poverty and Landlessness in Kelantan, Two Faces: Detention Without Trial, Syed Husin Ali: Memoirs of a Political Struggle, The Malay Rulers: Regression and Reform, Ethnic Relations in Malaysia: Harmony and Conflict and  A People's History of Malaysia.

As a scholar, he has constantly stressed the need to revisit Malaysia's official history, which he said is very often about individuals and groups in the elite strata of society. He believes that there is also an alternative history that needs to be explored which tells of the struggle of the common man.

He became a British Academy Visiting Fellow, at Cambridge University in 2005.

Internationally, he has also been a member of the International Mission to Investigate Genocide in Bangkok, the Panel of Judges for the People’s Tribunal on Industrial and Environmental Threats in Bhopal, India, and the International Investigation into Deportees in Sri Lanka.

Political activism

While a student, he became the president of the Universiti Malaya Malay Language Society and was also secretary-general of the joint Committee of student groups - GPMS-UMSU-NUSSU.

Along with his housemate and fellow progressive intellectual Kassim Ahmad, Syed Husin was influenced by the Malay left-wing leaders Dr Burhanuddin Helmi, Ishak Hj Muhammad (Pak Sako) and Ahmad Boestamam.

He joined the Parti Rakyat Malaysia while also serving as an academic and along with Kassim, was part of the team of young leaders that re-branded the party as Parti Sosialis Rakyat Malaysia (Malaysian People's Socialist Party) in the late 1960s.

Detention without trial

In 1974, Syed Husin was detained without trial under the Internal Security Act (ISA)  following protests by farmers in Baling and students in Kuala Lumpur.

He was tortured and asked to confess to being an agent of the Communist Party of Malaya. He was also asked to implicate members of the Malaysian government but Syed Husin declined to provide his interrogators with a false confession.

During the initial stages of his detention in both the police lockup and at the notorious Kamunting camp, Syed Husin was often housed with then student leader Anwar Ibrahim, who later became Malaysia's deputy prime minister.

He was detained without trial for six years and released in 1980.

In the 1980s, PSRM was much in the wilderness particularly after Kassim left the party to join Umno.

Syed Husin and lawyer Abdul Razak Ahmad were among the key figures who kept the party alive at this time.

Election contests

In 1990, he was elected as the president of Parti Rakyat Malaysia, which was rebranding once again at the time and dropped the 'socialist' tag from its name.

As a result, he was asked to leave his job as a professor in the department of anthropology and sociology at the Universiti of Malaya.

The university used the 1975 amendments to the University and University Colleges Act that barred lecturers and students from active party politics to force him out of academic life.

He took optional retirement having served as a member of the teaching staff for nearly 28 years, which included the six years' detention without trial.

Syed Husin contested three General Elections but lost in each.

In 1990, he contested the Batu (Kuala Lumpur federal constituency) under the Parti Rakyat Malaysia banner as part of the Gagasan Rakyat coalition. He garnered 25,259 votes (40.13 percent) losing by 11,387 votes to Barisan Nasional's Alexander Lee Yu Lung.

In 1995 and 1999, he ran in the Petaling Jaya Selatan (federal constituency) parliamentary race, losing on both occasions to Barisan Nasional's Donald Lim Siang Chai.

In 1995, he garnered 15,021 votes (35.36 percent) losing by 11,625 votes to Lim while In 1999, he garnered 20,736 votes (45.30 percent) in losing to Lim by 3,845 votes.

In 2004, his name was proposed as a Parti Keadilan Rakyat candidate for Kota Bharu, but this was rejected by PAS spiritual adviser and Kelantan Menteri Besar Nik Aziz Nik Mat as well as PAS president Abdul Hadi Awang both of whom cited Syed Husin's socialist background as objectionable.

He has also been involved in various human rights campaigns as well as championing the rights of urban settlers (squatters).

He served as president of Parti Rakyat Malaysia from 1990 until 2003, before taking office as deputy president of Parti Keadilan Rakyat in 2003. He served in that role until 2010.

He also served as a Senator in the Dewan Negara of Malaysia, representing Selangor from 2009 to 2015.

In May 9, 2018 he was part of Parti Keadilan Rakyat's election 'war room' as the party helped unseat the Umno/Barisan Nasional which had been in power since Malaysia's independence in 1957.

Personal life

He was married to Sabariah Abdullah, who died in 2013.

The couple had three children. His son Muhammad Ali Syed Husin (spelled Hussein) is an academic at the Borneo Marine Research Institute, Universiti Malaysia Sabah.

Bibliography

References 

1936 births
Living people
Members of the Dewan Negara
Malaysian socialists
Parti Rakyat Malaysia politicians
People's Justice Party (Malaysia) politicians
21st-century Malaysian politicians